Camerata Chicago is a Chicago-based chamber orchestra founded by conductor Drostan Hall which had its debut in 2003. The orchestra performs a wide array of classical and romantic works as well as newly commissioned pieces.

Performances
Camerata Chicago performs 3–4 concert series a year in Chicago venues such as the Chicago Cultural Center and Murphy Auditorium.

External links
 Camerata Chicago homepage

Chamber orchestras
Musical groups from Chicago
Musical groups established in 2003
Orchestras based in Illinois